Noah Bryant Munck (born May 3, 1996) is an American actor, comedian, YouTube personality and music producer known for his roles as Gibby in the Nickelodeon series iCarly and "Naked Rob" Smith in the ABC comedy series The Goldbergs. He also produces electronic music under the alias NoxiK and creates independent comedy videos on YouTube.<ref>Soundcloud, [https://soundcloud.com/noxik NoxiK's sounds on SoundCloud - Hear the world's sounds], reference added January 15, 2013.</ref>

Early life
Munck was born and raised in Mission Viejo in Orange County, California. He is the oldest of five children of Kymbry (née Robinson) and Greg Munck, an executive pastor at Crossline Community Church in Laguna Hills. He was involved in his school drama program while filming for iCarly'. One of his brothers, Ethan Munck, played Gibby's 8-year-old brother Guppy in five episodes of iCarly. In fall 2014, Munck was accepted to and began attending Biola University as a cinema and media arts major.

Career

iCarly
In 2007, Munck began a recurring role for three seasons on the Nickelodeon television series iCarly as Gibby, one of Carly, Sam and Freddie's friends. In 2010, Munck was elevated to a regular cast member from the fourth season onwards. In 2011, he was nominated for the "Favorite TV Sidekick" award at the Kids' Choice Awards.

Proposals were put forth in 2013 for a TV series called Gibby, a spin-off of iCarly that would star Munck. The series was to star Gibby working at a recreational center where he mentors four middle-schoolers. The series was not picked up, although Munck reprised the role of Gibby in the spin-off series Sam & Cat in 2014 for the episode "#SuperPsycho". Munck did not return to reprise his role in the 2021 revival series. His brother Ethan, however, reprised his role as Guppy in one episode of the revival series.

NoxiK
Munck also produces electronic dance music under the name NoxiK. He released his first song, "Beginnings", on January 20, 2012. Since then, he began to release songs he created to his YouTube account. He released a small EP called Hotline on April 23, 2013. On December 21, 2013, NoxiK released a single entitled "Killjoy" on SoundCloud and YouTube. It was re-posted on SoundCloud by EDM.com and has become one of his most successful singles to date. He released his first official EP titled Road Warrior'' on March 24, 2014. As of October 2017, the project has been inactive. However, he has put songs out on another SoundCloud account, named SADWORLDBEATS, and has been frequently releasing music from that account.

Sadworld
On October 9, 2016, Munck started Sadworld, a YouTube channel dedicated to "weird, absurd" and experimental comedy sketches. The videos have a distinct editing style, described as "an amalgamation of images, glitches and sounds designed to overload viewers' senses."

Activism
Munck is an active supporter of Camp Del Corazon, a summer camp on Catalina Island, California, for children with heart disease.

Filmography

Discography

Awards and nominations

References

External links

 

1996 births
Living people
21st-century American male actors
21st-century American male musicians
American male child actors
American male comedians
American male film actors
American male television actors
American male voice actors
Biola University alumni
Dubstep musicians
Male actors from California
Male actors from Orange County, California
Musicians from Orange County, California
People from Mission Viejo, California